Jaber is an Arabic name for males used as a given name and surname. 

Jaber or Al Jaber may also refer to:

 Jaber, Iran
 Jaber Castle (Qal'at Ja'bar), a castle in Syria
 Jaber Dam, a dam in Kukherd city, Iran
 Jaber Metro Station (Isfahan), 
 Aqabat Jaber, a Palestinian refugee camp in the West Bank
 Al Jaber Aviation, an Emirati business jet airline

See also
 
 Jabba (disambiguation)
 Jabir, a name
 Gaber (disambiguation)
 Al-jabr, which became "algebra", first mentioned in The Compendious Book on Calculation by Completion and Balancing